Edward of Wessex may refer to:

Edward the Elder (c. 870 – 924), King of Wessex
Edward the Martyr (c. 962 – 978), King of the English
Edward the Confessor (c. 1003 – 1066), King of the English
Prince Edward, Earl of Wessex (born 1964), youngest child of Queen Elizabeth II